D21 may refer to:

Vehicles

Aircraft 
 Dewoitine D.21, a French fighter
 Fokker D.XXI, a Dutch fighter
 Lockheed D-21, an American reconnaissance drone
 Salmson D21 Phrygane, a French utility aircraft

Ships 
 , a Nueva Esparta-class destroyer of the Venezuelan Navy
 , a County-class destroyer of the Royal Navy
 , a Q-class destroyer of the Royal Navy
 , a Ruler-class escort aircraft carrier of the Royal Navy
 , a W-class destroyer of the Royal Navy
 , a Fletcher-class destroyer of the Spanish Navy

Surface vehicles  
 Allis-Chalmers D21, an American tractor
 D21 Navara, a Nissan Datsun pickup truck
 LNER Class D21, a class of British steam locomotives

Other uses 
 Arriflex D-21, a digital motion picture camera
 Chondroma
 D21 road (Croatia)
 D21 – Janeček method, an electoral system
 D21, a computer from Datasaab
 D-21 Special, a guitar made by Martin Guitar